Visso is a comune (municipality) in the Province of Macerata in the Italian region Marche, located about  southwest of Ancona and about  southwest of Macerata. It houses the seat of Monti Sibillini National Park.

Main sights 
San Giacomo church and monastery
Chiesa del Santissimo Redentore e Santa Maria 
Chiesa della Concezione
Chiesa della Madonna di Cardosa
Sant'Agostino
Sant'Antonio
San Francesco
San Lorenzo
Santa Maria Annunziata di Mevale
Santa Maria Assunta
Santa Maria delle Cave
Santa Maria delle Grazie
Collegiata di Santa Maria
Sant'Agostino Secondo
Santuario di Macereto

See also
Camerino
Monti Sibillini

References

External links
 Official website 

Cities and towns in the Marche